The Sydney Glaciarium was the third indoor ice skating facility built in Australia and the first indoor ice skating rink built in New South Wales, located in Ultimo, New South Wales.

History

A proposal for the construction of an ice skating rink, on the site of a former Cyclorama located on George Street, Sydney near the railway, was published 20 November 1906. The rink would feature large refrigeration works and cooling chambers for commercial use in the basement of the building. The architects appointed for the construction were Coxon and Cuthbert.

The Sydney Glaciarium was opened to the public on the afternoon of 25 July 1907 in front of an estimated 2000 spectators. The opening ceremony was performed by New South Wales Premier Mr. J. H. Carruthers.

The first season of ice skating and ice activities at the Sydney Glaciarium concluded at 11:00pm on 2 November 1907 with 800 skaters taking to the ice for the last time in the season. There was a signal given to cease skating and the skaters joined hands and sang Auld Lang Syne as well as the Australian National Anthem. Cheers were given to the rink manager, Dunbar Poole. The building would still be used until the next ice skating season began, as a wooden floor could be put down and the hall used for another purpose during the warm months of the year. use of the Glaciarium during the warmer season was secured by Mr. Thomas James West for the showing of films.

Pricing and session times 
When the Sydney Glaciarium opened there were 3 sessions available during the day:

 Morning Session 10:00am to 12:00noon
 Afternoon Session 2:00pm to 5:00pm
 Evening Session 8:00pm to 10:30pm

Pricing for admission was 2 shillings.

Pricing for ice skate hire was 6 pence

Architecture and specifications 

The Sydney Glaciarium was built on the site of the old Cyclorama, which was demolished. The building was illuminated with electric lighting.

Ice hockey 

With the opening of the Sydney Glaciarium, ice hockey matches between Victoria and New South Wales representative teams began almost immediately. Teams from both states met up in the Sydney Glaciarium to play on 5 August 1907 at 10:15 pm. The New South Wales team won the game 3 - 0.

In its second ice skating season, the Sydney Glaciarium management drew plans to facilitate ice hockey matches between an Australian team selected from ice skating patrons and teams drawn from the crew of various visiting fleet of American warships, known by the name Great White Fleet. Sydney was the first stop made by the fleet to Australia and invitations to the proposed hockey match were sent to the officers and petty officers of each warship, planning to host the match on the evening of their arrival on 20 August 1908. The first match that was arranged ended up being scheduled for the evening of 26 August 1907 at the Sydney Glaciarium. Though the American team had not been on skates for 3 years, they still managed to win the game 5 - 1 against the Australian team formed from Sydney Glaciarium patrons. The Australian team was first to score but the Americans would tie up the game in the first half. In the second half, the Americans would go on to score 4 more goals. An important aspect to this game was that the American players were using much larger hockey sticks than the local Australian team.
The fleet would visit Melbourne afterwards where they would play ice hockey against a local team, presumably again, using the larger ice hockey sticks and a puck made from a disc of wood. Due to the Americans being short of 2 players, each team played with only 5 men per side but this would play an important part to establishing the codified version of ice hockey in Australia rather than the Australian variant played before.

See also 

List of ice rinks in Australia

References

External links 
Legends of Australian Ice

Indoor arenas in Australia
Sports venues in Sydney
Figure skating venues in Australia
Ice hockey venues in Australia
Speed skating venues in Australia
Multi-purpose stadiums in Australia